Persatuan Sepakbola Indonesia Fakfak (also known as Persifa Fakfak) is an Indonesian football club based in Fakfak Regency, West Papua. They currently compete in the Liga 3.

References

External links
Official site of Persifa Fakfak

Football clubs in Indonesia
Football clubs in West Papua (province)
Association football clubs established in 1973
1973 establishments in Indonesia